Dolakha may refer to:

Dolakha District, a district of Nepal
Dolakha Town, Nepal, a city in Nepal

See also
Dolakhae dialect, a dialect of the Newari language spoken in Nepal's Dolakha District